Mariquina is a commune in southern Chile, Valdivia Province, Los Ríos Region. It is located about 40 km northeast of Valdivia, close to Cruces River. The capital is the city of San José de la Mariquina. The commune's main economic activities are agriculture, cattle farming and wood pulp manufacturing.

Demographics
Of these, 8,925 (49%) lived in urban areas and 9,298 (51%) in rural areas. The population grew by 1.5% (271 persons) between the 1992 and 2002 censuses.

Administration
As a commune, Mariquina is a third-level administrative division of Chile administered by a municipal council, headed by an alcalde who is directly elected every four years. The current alcalde is Ronaldo Mitre Gatica.

Within the electoral divisions of Chile, Mariquina is represented in the Chamber of Deputies by Alfonso De Urresti (PS) and Roberto Delmastro (RN) as part of the 53rd electoral district, together with Valdivia, Lanco, Máfil and Corral.

History
In the mid-17th century local cacique Juan Manqueante ruled the lands of Mariquina. He presented himself to the Dutch who had arrived in Valdivia in 1643 as a friend. When the Spanish returned in 1645 he allied to them for about ten years until the Mapuche uprising of 1655. Local lore consider him the most notable person ever born in the lands of Mariquina. Manqueante was catholic according to contemporary chronicler Diego de Rosales.     

According to Tomás Guevara by the 18th century the Mapuche of Mariquina were among the last to raise chilihueques, a now extinct llama-like animal.

During the Mapuche uprising of 1881 most women of San José de la Mariquina were sent to the city of Valdivia as men prepared for hostilities. Chileans and German settlers dug defensive trenches around the town. At the moment of the uprising it was even thought that rebels could reach Valdivia in the south if they succeeded in penetrating San José de la Mariquina.

References

Bibliography

External links
  Municipality of Mariquina

Populated places in Valdivia Province
Communes of Chile
Populated places established in 1850